The name Philomela is derived from a figure in Greek mythology.

Philomela
Philomela may refer to:

Greek mythology
 Philomela (princess of Athens) (or Philomel) is a young woman in Greek mythology who was raped and her tongue removed by Tereus; later transformed into a nightingale by the gods and invoked as a symbol in art, literature and music.
 Philomela (mother of Patroclus) for a minor figure in Greek legend.

Arts and Letters
 Elizabeth Rowe (1674-1737), an English poet, who published works under the name "Philomela".
 "Philomela" is a poem written in 1853 by English poet Matthew Arnold (1822-1888), 
 Philomela is a 2004 opera written by Scottish composer James Dillon (composer)

Science
 196 Philomela, an S-type asteroid located in the main asteroid belt between Mars and Jupiter
 Ypthima philomela is the scientific name of the baby fivering, a Satyrinae butterfly found in Asia
 Microcerculus philomela is the scientific name of the northern nightingale-wren, a passerine bird found in Central America

See also
 Philomel (disambiguation) (another form of the name)